FUBAR Radio is an internet radio station based in the United Kingdom.

History 

FUBAR received £125,000 from the Early Advantage Fund, managed by Midven on behalf of the Department for Business, Innovation and Skills and the European Regional Development Fund, intended to kick-start businesses in the West Midlands.

Notable former presenters 

 James Acaster
 Ian Boldsworth
 Justin Lee Collins
 Mark Dolan
 Jon Gaunt
 Ed Gamble
 Nick Helm
 Richard Herring
 Sean Hughes
 Calum McSwiggan
 Andy Parsons
 Katie Price
 Lou Sanders

References

External links 
 fubarradio.com

Internet radio in the United Kingdom
Radio stations established in 2014
2014 establishments in the United Kingdom